Cementerio Paso Molino, known also as Cementerio de La Teja, is a cemetery in Montevideo, Uruguay. It is located in the barrio of La Teja.

Interments
 María Auxiliadora Delgado (1937–2019), First Lady of Uruguay (2005–10 and 2015–19)
 Abdón Porte (1893–1918), association football player
 Carlos Solé (1916–1975), sportscaster
 Raúl Sendic (1925–1989), Tupamaro guerrilla fighter
 Tabaré Vázquez (1940–2020), President of Uruguay (2005–10 and 2015–20)

References

External links
 Cementerio Paso Molino – data

Cemeteries in Montevideo